Leucodictyon is a genus of cercozoa.

It includes the species Leucodictyon marinum.

References

Cercozoa genera